Cohen House is a historic home located at Petersburg, Virginia. The original building was built in 1851.  It has evolved into a three-story, three bay, Second Empire style brick dwelling.  It has a tall mansard roof with decorative slate shingles added during a major remodeling in 1897–1898.

It was listed on the National Register of Historic Places in 2007.

References

Houses on the National Register of Historic Places in Virginia
Second Empire architecture in Virginia
Houses completed in 1851
Houses in Petersburg, Virginia
National Register of Historic Places in Petersburg, Virginia
1851 establishments in Virginia